Durrës District was one of the  was one of the 36 districts of Albania, which were dissolved in July 2000 and replaced by 12 counties. The district seat was the city of Durrës. Its territory is now part of Durrës County: the municipalities of Durrës and Shijak.

Administrative divisions

The district consisted of the following municipalities:

Durrës
Gjepalaj
Ishëm
Katund i Ri
Maminas
Manëz
Rrashbull
Shijak
Sukth
Xhafzotaj

Note: - urban municipalities in bold

References

Districts of Albania
Geography of Durrës County